Stanley Portal Hyatt (2 January 1877 – 30 June 1914) was an English explorer, hunter, and writer. Hyatt left his comfortable family home and struck out around the world c. 1896. He arrived in Africa to seek his fortune during 1898. In his written works, Hyatt describes his life and experiences in Australia, Rhodesia and the Philippines. He wrote fluently and skilfully about life on "The Road", and about his fellow-riders and his animals. Hyatt had a bitter contempt for commercially inspired progress, vehemently defending the "underdog" whenever he could, and was a savage critic of The Establishment. The Old Transport Road and The Diary of a Soldier of Fortune are his famous works.

Family 
Stanley Portal Hyatt was born on 2 January 1877, at The Hawthorns, Mt. Ephraim Road, Streatham, Surrey, England and died on 30 June 1914, in Longton Grove, Sydenham, Surrey, England. He married Margaret Annie Marston on 20 July 1908, in London, England. She was the daughter of John William Marston. After her death in 1912 he married Charlotte Caroline Key on 4 May 1914, in Newton Abbot, Devon, England. She was the daughter of Walter C. Key and Caroline Mcleod Godsell.

Hyatt's great-great-grandfather Abraham Portal was a goldsmith who later in life became bankrupt. Abraham was also the grandfather of the first Baron Hatherton. Stanley's Hyatt great-great-grandfather, John Hyatt, was a humble innkeeper in Dorset. His Hyatt great-grandfather began life as an apprenticed shoemaker. His great-grandfather, Richard Brinsley Sheridan Portal, was apprenticed to a grocer. His Hyatt grandfather, Charles Hyatt, was a dissenting minister preaching to the poor of the London slums. His Portal grandfather, Richard Brinsley Portal, was a fairly wealthy grocer and wine merchant in Northampton. His parents, Charles James Hyatt and Amy Portal, were both from now wealthy Victorian families, the various grandparents having prospered from preaching and trading.

Biography 
Stanley Portal Hyatt rejected his family's great wealth (although he took a fair amount with him) to strike out on his own as one of the minor Victorian explorers. He was born in 1877, and educated at Dulwich College. He left school early in 1892 after studying engineering. He then spent two years in the workshops of a big firm of electrical engineers pioneering electric lighting, and then wanderlust gripped him.

Before his eighteenth birthday  he watched, from the fo'cs'le of a windjammer, the silver crescent of the moon rising above Sydney Heads in Australia. After a voyage 
of a hundred days he arrived in New South Wales to find the colony practically bankrupt and with nothing to which he could turn his hand. He spent a fortnight in the New South Wales capital, which abounded then not only in larrikins but in fan-tan shops, where all day one heard "those gruesome, horrible claws," the long nails of the Chinese croupier, scratching over the matting as he raked in the lost money, or watched the concentrated spite on his face as he paid out to an unusually successful gambler.

Thereafter Stanley got a berth in a big sheep station some four hundred miles up-country, where a bottle of whiskey cost as much as two sheep. It was a magnificent place, splendidly maintained and splendidly stocked, but even so far from the coast he found little suggestion of the rolling pastoral countryside, and no hint at all of the Australia of this novelist. He was not sorry to cut loose and drift down again to Sydney, even though he reached the coast with two pounds in his pocket and little chance of earning more. He then turned to beachcombing around Sydney. A fortnight of loafing varied by daily visits to the cheapest of cheap eating-houses saw the end of his capital, whereupon his first dress suit, pride of its owner's heart, passed into the hands of a little Jew in Argyll Street for a recompense of ten shillings.

Then his luck turned, and somebody gave him an engineering job of sorts. Even that filtered out before long, and this young emigrant, not yet nineteen, cabled home for money, and shook the dust of Australia from his shoes in disgust.

Stanley was then to spend eighteen months at home in London, a period devoted mainly to a newly acquired craze for inventing things (mainly in order to raise funds for his further overseas expeditions). By the end of that time the nation was the richer to the extent of patents on five epoch-making inventions, to the value of which it displayed an utterly callous indifference. These included a new camera, a bicycle brake, a steam engine valve, an arrangement for glazing the windows of railway carriages, and, lastly, a paraffin lamp that could be used with the new incandescent mantle. He and his brother Malcolm worked on that together, and they had a company promoter ready to float it when it was ready. They grew quite used to fires during the experiments. They kept a box of sand at the end of the bench, and every time the lamp burst this would be emptied over the blaze. There was no denying that the apparatus worked. When the atmospheric conditions were right, or when the thing was in a good humour, the light would be far brighter than that obtainable from coal gas; but at other times it poured out volumes of thick, black smoke, or, in default, blew the mantle to pieces. They never succeeded in getting an automatic adjustment, and ultimately lost about a hundred pounds over the scheme.

Disillusioned, in 1897 Stanley left home again for Bulawayo in Africa, to seek his fortune in the new gold mines, where he went on to Matabeleland. There, Stanley and his brothers Malcolm and Amyas (who had recently returned from exploring Canada) signed contracts as mine engineers to stay in Matabeleland for two years. After initial hardships enough to have sent the average raw youth running back to the fleshpots of civilisation without loss of time, they reached the mine itself. Stanley was appointed an electrical engineer of the "Geelong," a big reef of hungry looking white Quartz. The good ore was soon found to be patchy and the mine quickly closed. A new reef of some value was found and it reopened. This was to be a cycle repeated often, and the first good gold was exported in 1898. It was to be the first mine to turn out good quality gold bearing quartz north of the Crocodile River, just outside Gwanda. Whilst there the giraffes used to break Stanley's wires, and incidentally injure their own necks in the process, and the lions used to chew up his fowls, and when chance offered, his native workers as well. But Stanley finally succeeded in putting up important telephone lines, which were still (in 1920) working, and his bright arc lamps frightened away the Matabele rebels from the mine, whose fires, in a range of kopjes a bare five miles away, had formerly been the only illumination allowed on that stretch of veld.

The end of the Second Matabele War was practically in sight, the dawn of prosperity seemed to be coming as the territories of Matabeleland and Mashonaland were to become Rhodesia under the Cecil Rhodes administration, and the country was being opened up in earnest. The difficulties before them were infinitely worse than this first foray into Africa...

Two years of a mining camp, tin-roofed, fever-hunted, drink sodden, and dreary, was enough for young Hyatt, and when his contract ended, he bought a train and a pack donkey and trekked away to the unknown districts on the borders of Portuguese East Africa, merchant trading and hunting. For the next three years he never looked back. It was a fever-laden country – a veritable white man's grave ; but he had a constitution of iron which carried him through. His younger brother, Amyas Portal Hyatt, probably the most popular youngster ever in 
Rhodesia, joined him as partner, and everything the firm of Hyatt Brothers touched proved successful. The brothers set up a trading post at Shona village, and by the end of the Boer War the Hyatts had made a fortune, which included thirteen thousand acres of rubber-growing land granted them by the Portuguese Government in return for their exploring the India-rubber jungles of Mozambique.

By the age of 22 Stanley was the largest native trader in Eastern Mashonaland. He was a great traveller, opening up trade routes right across Africa, notably in Mozambique and Rhodesia (now Zimbabwe) where he used his ox carts to supply the trading posts of the Great White Hunters. He explored the centre part of Mozambique for the Portuguese, returning only to find his business ruined through the new cattle disease East Coast fever, then known as African Coast fever. An outbreak of Rinderpest in the 1890s had previously killed 80 to 90 percent of all cattle in Southern Africa. Cecil Rhodes had now imported 1000 new cattle from Australia, which were landed at Beira in Mozambique and were allowed to mix with the local cattle, exposing them to this new disease. East Coast Fever broke out as soon as Rhodes's herd reached Umtali and rapidly infected numbers of local cattle, ultimately spreading throughout the whole country. (It wasn't until 1902 that it was determined that this new disease was spread by ticks from the imported cattle). The Rhodesian Chartered Company's government was bombarded with requests and petitions to destroy any and every other beast that came into contact with the dead cattle, to stamp out the plague at the start, but the government claimed it was just a bad outbreak of redwater fever that would soon subside.

These pleas fell on deaf ears, and, in a letter to the Australian financial news Stanley wrote:
 
Some years later he wrote: 

Stanley had been driving supply wagons through the virgin veld for some ten years of unremitting toil and was rewarded, eventually, with little more than fond memories, financial ruin and ill-health. In just six short weeks the Hyatts were ruined ; their oxen were eaten by hyenas, their wagons were rotting by the roadside, and their trading stations left for the looting of the natives.

Together they made history in the early days of Bulawayo, and among other things were pioneers in the tobacco and rubber industries. Stanley and Amyas then struck out in search of rubber, but to trade for themselves this time, and failed to find any good sources in the area. During 1903 Stanley was responsible for building the first industrial food refrigeration plant in Umtali, a great coastal port in Rhodesia. Demand for meat had risen during the Boer war and the export of beef was now the mainstay of trade in the port. After this, he tried his hand at gold prospecting. For a while longer the brothers tried to re-establish themselves in Africa, but an unsuccessful mining venture finally exhausted their patience and they decided to leave and ride the tramp steamers around the world.

Stanley and Amyas began their way homeward through the Orient. Stanley and his brothers had started from Central Africa in a penniless condition, but by lecturing and journalism in Durban, they got to Mauritius, from which they were soon exported as distressed British subjects. At Colombo they lectured and sold newspaper articles, and managed to then get on to the Straits Settlements and Manila in the Philippine Islands when the Samar revolt was just breaking out. Stanley was involved in several wars, but most notably here as a mercenary and not fighting for anyone in particular at first. Stanley was the only Englishman who fought through the 1904–05 campaign in the Philippine–American War for the American Army. The brothers had selected this destination on the general principle that "where there is a row there is an Englishman." Through General Corbin's kindness they reached the front, and what they saw there was incorporated in Stanleys later book "The Little Brown Brother". Their newspaper articles on the campaign provoked the wrath of a certain element in the civil government, but gave unqualified satisfaction to the Army generally.

The next objective point of the brothers was Vladivostok, then on the point of being invested by the Japanese, and they arranged to sail on a blockade runner to that port. While waiting for the ship to get ready for sea, Amyas Hyatt was bitten on the cheek by some 
poisonous insect, and died in the "Manila Hospital" (most likely just an American aid station) of Anthrax. Stanley, fearfully shaken by the blow of his brothers death, then travelled on Eastwards to Singapore and China. He drifted up the China coast, then to Japan, and finally home to England across the Americas.

Stanley had lost everything, and had fallen so far behind in his own profession of engineering that it was hopeless to try to turn his hand to it again. He was still but an amateur in journalism, yet he went to Fleet Street, for want of anything better, and had the usual experience, disappointment and semi-starvation. However, the success of his first book, Marcus Hay, enabled him to abandon newspaper work for fiction, and thereafter he rapidly made a place for himself among English writers.

Now in his 30s (1905), Stanley started writing boys story books of his adventures and books about his travels. The books are documented, and some are on line. By 1910 he was quite ill as a result of his travels and was addicted to Morphine. He slowly succumbed to this and malaria (hence his morphine addiction) and finally died of Tuberculosis in 1914.

In his own words, taken from his book 'The Diary of a Soldier of Fortune', he describes his experiences as "Engineer, Sheep Station Hand, Nigger Driver, Hunter, Trader, Transport Rider, Labour Agent, Cold Storage Engineer, Explorer, Lecturer, Pressman, American Soldier, Blockade Runner and Tramp"

Literary work

 In most of his works, Hyatt describes his life and experiences in Australia, Rhodesia and the Philippines. When he had returned home to England he had a very hard struggle to make a success with his first novel, Marcus Hay, but soon following this he wrote the "Little Brown Brother" dealing with the Philippines, which made him well known in American literary circles. Other notable titles include: The Marriage of Hilary Carden; Black Sheep; The Law of the Bolo; The Land of Promises; Biffel, a Trek Ox; The Diary of a Soldier of Fortune; The Northward Trek; Off the Main Track. He also wrote a lot of short stories for the "Penny dreadful" story magazines of the time, and became a popular name with young boys of the early 20th century.
Hyatt writes fluently and knowledgeably about life on "The Road", about the unspoilt and sometimes savagely inhospitable countryside of early Rhodesia, about the skills and courage needed to get the waggons through. He writes lovingly of his fellow-riders, and of his animals. For contemporary society, and for commercially inspired "progress", however, he has nothing but bitter contempt. Although some find his writing racist and blunt, it portrays life in the African bush as it was, and not as a fanciful romantic dream. The Old Transport Road is an informative and absorbing book. It is also a tribute to those who braved the trackless wilderness by ox-waggon – men who can legitimately be compared to the 19th century pioneers of modern America.

Some of Hyatt's documented short stories:
 The Passengers of the "Corunna" (ss) Cassell's Jul 1909
 The Witch-Lion (ss) Everybody's Weekly 2 Sep 1911
 Dead Ivory, (ss) Boys' Life Jun 1912
 The Chief of the Mountains (ss) Boy's Own Paper 26 Oct 1912
 The Case of the S.S. Patagonia (ss) The Red Magazine 15 Nov 1912
 The Blood-Spoor of the Sable Antelope (ss) Boy's Own Paper 14 Dec 1912
 Snakes I Have Known (ar) Boy's Own Paper 18 Jan 1913
 The Escape of the "Alleynian" (ss) Boy's Own Paper 1 Feb 1913, etc.
 The Gun-Runners. A yarn of the Philippines (ss) Boy's Own Paper 7 Jun 1913, etc.
 The War-Makers (ss) Boy's Own Paper Nov 1913
 The Dead Letter (nv) Tit-Bits Novels 27 Apr 1914
 The Glacier's Secret (nv) Tit-Bits Novels 23 Feb 1914
 The Witchdoctor's Revenge (ss) Boy's Own Paper Feb 1914
 The Black Pearl of Peihoo. A tale of the Malay Seas (sl) Boy's Own Paper Apr 1914, etc.
 Marshal Mora's Revolution (ss) Boy's Own Paper Jun 1914
 On Dangerous Service. A Story of Blockade Running (ss) Boy's Own Paper Nov 1914
 Bushman Reef. A tale of an African mine (ss) Boy's Own Paper Jan 1915
 The Case of Bertram Dantone (ss) New Story Magazine May 1915
 On the Plateau. A story of Mashonaland (ss) Boy's Own Paper May 1915

All of Hyatt's known major works:

Notes

References

 
 Stanley Portal Hyatt - NY Times Obituary
 The Ashley-Pringle Guide to the UK Pulps 
 'HYATT, Stanley Portal', Who Was Who, A & C Black, 1920–2008; on line edn, Oxford University Press, Dec 2007
 'Born wanderer: the life of Stanley Portal Hyatt' Author Paul Frederic Cranefield 
 'Science and Empire East Coast Fever in Rhodesia and the Transvaal' Author Paul F Cranefield

External links
 
 

1877 births
1914 deaths
English explorers
Explorers of Africa
19th-century explorers
20th-century explorers
20th-century English male writers
20th-century deaths from tuberculosis
Tuberculosis deaths in England